Akira was a planned American cyberpunk film based on the Japanese manga of the same name by Katsuhiro Otomo, and was set to be the second film adaptation following the 1988 anime version. The film was set to be directed by Taika Waititi, from a script he co-wrote with Michael Golamco.

Warner Bros. Pictures, which had held the rights to a live-action version adaptation of the manga since 2002, has repeatedly struggled to get production off the ground over various concerns, leaving the film in development hell. In 2017, Waititi was announced to direct and co-write, with production to start in 2019, and scheduled for release in 2021. However, just prior to production, Waititi left the project to direct Thor: Love and Thunder (2022), putting the film in development hell again.

Premise
A secret military project endangers Neo-Tokyo when it turns a biker gang member into a rampaging psychic psychopath that only two teenagers and a group of psychics can stop.

Production

Earlier attempts
In the 1990s, Sony Pictures obtained the rights to Katsuhiro Otomo's manga series, Akira, with the intent of creating a live-action adaptation, following the release of the 1988 anime film but was ultimately cancelled due to budgetary concerns. In 2002, Warner Bros. acquired the rights to create a live-action remake of Akira as a seven-figure deal. However, the project has undergone several failed attempts to produce it, and is frequently considered to have been in development hell. Over the course of its troubled development, at least five different directors and ten different writers have been attached. The directors reportedly had some freedom with the project; according to writer Gary Whitta, who had written an early draft of the screenplay, they were told that Otomo had instructed those working on the film "basically to not be afraid to change things, that he wanted to see an original and different interpretation, not just a straight-up remake". In a June 2017 interview, Otomo said that he was "basically done with Akira" as a manga, and that "if someone wants to do something new with Akira then I am mostly okay with that", on the condition that he be allowed to review and approve of any approach a writer might take with a live-action adaptation.

IGN concluded that long-term troubles with producing the live-action film primarily came from two areas. Firstly, there has been the fear of whitewashing or racebending, casting American or other Western actors in lieu of Japanese ones, which has frequently come to light when such actors have been reported as under consideration for these roles. Secondly, Akira itself is not considered a story that is easy to relocate outside of Japan, due to the heavy influence on the original story of Japan's role in World War II, including the atomic bombings of Japan, and their own Unit 731. Attempts to make it more Westernized in order to draw American audiences, such as using the September 11 attacks as part of the establishing events instead of the atomic bombings, required fundamental changes to the story, which has subsequently drawn much criticism.

Shortly after Warner Bros. acquired the rights, Stephen Norrington was slated to direct with James Robinson writing the screenplay and Dan Lin producing. Norrington had planned to make his adaptation more appealing to Western audiences. His version also would have made Kaneda and Tetsuo brothers. However, following the commercial failure of The League of Extraordinary Gentlemen in 2003 (which both Norrington and Robinson also collaborated on), the project was put on hold.

Director Ruairi Robinson announced in 2008 he was teaming with Whitta to adapt the manga for live-action, with the plan to split it into two films, with the first to be completed and released by 2009. Producer Andrew Lazar said that the first film would cover volumes 1 through 3 of the manga, with the rest covered in the second film. Whitta, in a 2015 interview, said that the story would have taken place in a futuristic Japan-owned Manhattan, renaming the region to New Tokyo. This would have allowed them to have used a mixture of Western and Asian cultures and actors so as to avoid concerns that they would be whitewashing the project. Robinson left the project in 2009 and was replaced by directors Allen and Albert Hughes, though later Allen would drop out in 2011. They used Whitta's script, with additional rewrites by Mark Fergus and Hawk Ostby, with plans to aim for a PG-13 rating. Around 2011, a version of the Akira script leaked online; though it was unclear if it was Whitta's or Fergus/Ostby's draft, the scripts were criticized for deviating significantly from the source material in several ways, according to IGN, such as making Akira a "psychotic murderous creepy child", the inclusion of heavy-handed references to the September 11 attacks, and characters written in a misogynistic fashion. Around this same time, casting calls for the film led to accusations of whitewashing. Shortly after these events, Hughes left the project, citing "amicable creative differences".

In July 2011, Jaume Collet-Serra was hired to direct, with Steve Kloves providing revision work on a draft by screenwriter Albert Torres. The film was greenlit in October 2011, with filming eyed to begin by February or March 2012.

In January 2012, as production was gearing up to begin in Vancouver, Warner Bros. halted production, citing issues with casting, the script and the budget. Collet-Serra would depart the film during this time, but would return in August 2013. He detailed his vision for the film in February 2014, stating that it would be respectful of the source material, but would still have differences. Dante Harper would be hired to write a new draft of the screenplay in 2014. However, by March 2015, Collett-Serra stated that no further development on the film had been made. In July of that, Marco Ramirez was hired to rewrite the script. After Collett-Serra once again exited the project, Warner Bros. offered George Miller the chance to direct the film, but he turned it down due to commitments to other projects. The studio was also reported to have been in talks with Justin Lin to direct the film. Jordan Peele was offered the chance to direct, but declined.

Development
In September 2017, it was announced that director Taika Waititi was in talks to direct. He asserted his intention to cast Asian-American teenagers to play the leads to avoid concerns over whitewashing, and preferred lesser-known actors for the roles. He also intended to adapt the original six-volume manga rather than directly adapting the anime film.

In May 2019, Waititi was officially confirmed to direct the film, and would be co-writing the script with Michael Golamco, with a release date of May 21, 2021. Filming was scheduled to have commenced in California in July 2019. However, when it was announced that Waititi would direct Thor: Love and Thunder, he dropped out of Akira, once again putting the project on hold. Waititi said to IGN in October 2019 that he is still committed to Akira once his commitment on Thor is complete. Warner Bros. ultimately removed Akira from its release schedule by December 2019, replacing the May 2021 date with The Matrix Resurrections. In an interview in February 2020, Waititi said that Thor had caused Akira to be pushed out at least two years, and he was not sure if he would still be involved. In August 2021, Waititi re-confirmed that he still intended to make the film, with no further announcements made since.

Casting
Several actors have been considered for principal roles throughout the development of the project. By May 2011, Andrew Garfield, Robert Pattinson and Michael Fassbender were met with for the role of Tetsuo, while Garrett Hedlund, Fassbender, Chris Pine, Justin Timberlake and Joaquin Phoenix were being considered for the role of Kaneda. Keanu Reeves was also being courted to star. Gary Oldman and Helena Bonham Carter were offered the roles of The Colonel and Lady Miyako, respectively. By November, Hedlund had entered negotiations to star as Kaneda, and Kristen Stewart had been offered the role of Ky Reed. Oldman declined his offer, and Ken Watanabe was approached to replace him. Paul Dano and Michael Pitt were reported to be testing for the role of Kaneda, and Keira Knightley was also approached for a role before production halted.

Release
Akira was set to be released theatrically in the United States by Warner Bros. Pictures. It was initially scheduled to be released on May 21, 2021, but was delayed indefinitely five months after Waititi left the project.

References

External links
 

Cancelled films
Unreleased American films
American science fiction action films
American science fiction adventure films
Cyberpunk films
Dystopian films
Films set in the future
Motorcycling films
American post-apocalyptic films
American science fantasy films
Akira (franchise)
Japan in non-Japanese culture
Live-action films based on manga